Giacomo da Mantova, O.P. or Giacomo de Mantova (died 1528) was a Roman Catholic prelate who served as Bishop of Lesina (1526–1528).

Biography
Giacomo da Mantova was ordained a priest in the Order of Preachers. 
On 27 April 1526, he was appointed during the papacy of Pope Clement VII as Bishop of Lesina. 
He served as Bishop of Lesina until his death in 1528.

References 

16th-century Italian Roman Catholic bishops
Bishops appointed by Pope Clement VII
1528 deaths
Dominican bishops